
Molochnyi Estuary, or Molochnyi Lyman, is an estuary of the Molochna River, located on the north-western coast of the Sea of Azov. About 10km north is the town of Melitopol.

Parameters of the water body:
 Length 32 km
 Width 8 km
 Depth 3 m
 Area 168 km2

It is connected  to the Sea of Azov by an artificial canal.

References

External links

Кисла доля Молочного лиману (Sour share of the Molochna (Milk) Estuary) 
 Екологія мовою серця громадськості — На Молочному лимані ситуація не є задовільною (Ecology in the heart of the public - The situation at the Milky Way (Molochna Estuary) is not satisfactory)

Bodies of water of the Sea of Azov
Estuaries of Ukraine
Ramsar sites in Ukraine